Henry Butcher may refer to:

Samuel Butcher (classicist) ((Samuel) Henry Butcher), Anglo-Irish classicist and Unionist MP
Hank Butcher, American baseball player

See also
Harry Butcher (disambiguation)